Michele Volpe (born 16 September 1997) is an Italian footballer who plays as a forward for  club Juve Stabia on loan from Frosinone.

Club career
He made his professional debut in the Serie B for Frosinone on 10 December 2016 in a game against Salernitana.

On 7 August 2019, he joined Viterbese on loan.

On 1 February 2021 he was loaned to Catania.

On 9 July 2021, he returned to Viterbese on another loan.

On 27 January 2022, he joined Vibonese on loan.

On 13 July 2022, Volpe was loaned to Pergolettese. On 31 January 2023, he moved on an new loan to Juve Stabia.

References

External links
 

1997 births
Living people
Sportspeople from Benevento
Footballers from Campania
Italian footballers
Association football forwards
Serie B players
Serie C players
Frosinone Calcio players
Rimini F.C. 1912 players
U.S. Viterbese 1908 players
Catania S.S.D. players
U.S. Vibonese Calcio players
U.S. Pergolettese 1932 players
S.S. Juve Stabia players